Gevherhan Sultan may refer to Ottoman princesses:
 Şehsuvar Kadın - consort of Ottoman Sultan Mustafa II and mother of Sultan Osman III.
 Şehsuvar Kadın - consort of Ottoman Caliph Abdülmejid II.